Albert Bernard Niehaus (June 1, 1899 – October 14, 1931) was a first baseman in Major League Baseball. He played for the Pittsburgh Pirates and Cincinnati Reds.

In 68 games during the 1925 season, Niehaus posted a .275 batting average (58-for-211) with 23 runs and 21 RBI without any home runs.

References

External links

1899 births
1931 deaths
Major League Baseball first basemen
Asheville Tourists players
Atlanta Crackers players
Bradenton Growers players
Chattanooga Lookouts players
Cincinnati Reds players
Columbia Comers players
Jacksonville Indians players
Jacksonville Scouts players
Memphis Chickasaws players
Mobile Bears players
Pittsburgh Pirates players
Spartanburg Spartans players
Baseball players from Cincinnati